The 2021 season for the  cycling team was its 15th season, all of which have been as a UCI WorldTeam. For the first season in its existence, however, the team had two title sponsors, as Canadian tech company Premier Tech joins longtime Kazakh sponsor Samruk-Kazyna.

Team roster 

Riders who joined the team for the 2021 season

Riders who left the team during or after the 2020 season

Season victories

National, Continental, and World Champions

Notes

References

External links 
 

Astana–Premier Tech
2021